Godzilla: Destroy All Monsters Melee is a fighting game based on Toho's Godzilla franchise. It was developed by Pipeworks Software and published by Infogrames under the Atari brand for GameCube in 2002. A companion game developed by WayForward Technologies for Game Boy Advance, Godzilla: Domination!, was released in November of the same year. Destroy All Monsters Melee was later released for Xbox in 2003, featuring additional content and enhanced graphics.

A sequel, Godzilla: Save the Earth, was released in November 2004.

Gameplay
The player plays as one of several  giant monsters (eleven playable characters: Anguirus, Destoroyah, Gigan, Godzilla 90s, Godzilla 2000, King Ghidorah, Mecha-King Ghidorah, Megalon, Orga, Rodan, and Mechagodzilla). The player must defeat their opponents via punches, kicks, and limb attacks (usually a tail-attack). Each monster can use their signature beam attack and throw environmental objects. Army forces (missile and freeze tanks) and the monster Hedorah (which slows a monster's energy regeneration) are also present and sporadically attack all monsters. Extras include powerup orbs, which provide additional health, energy, unlock a finishing move, or summon Mothra for an airstrike. Extra features include choice of several locations, and a "destruction" mode (in which players compete to destroy buildings in a city) and "melee" mode (in which up to four players can compete simultaneously).

Plot
The plot involves an alien race known as the Vortaak invading the Earth and assuming control of the planet's giant monsters, sending them to attack cities across the globe. One monster breaks free from the Vortaak's control, and battles the other monsters in order to drive off the Vortaak, and that monster is the king of the monsters, Godzilla.

Development
The game was announced by Infogrames on March 25, 2002, as a GameCube-exclusive, with Pipeworks Software announced as the developer and a release date within the fall of 2002. It was later shown off at E3 2002 and at Infogrames' press event in August.

In January 2003, Infogrames announced that the game would be released for the Xbox with the addition of MechaGodzilla 3 as a new playable character, two new stages, a Destruction Mode for single-player, and graphical upgrades.

Reception

The game received "mixed or average reviews" on all platforms according to video game review aggregator Metacritic.

Entertainment Weekly gave the GameCube version a B and stated that the game's biggest blunder "is that it just isn't campy enough." However, The Cincinnati Enquirer gave the same version three-and-a-half stars out of five and stated that "while the game has a variety of game-play modes, they aren't very deep once you've mastered the basics." The Village Voice also gave the Xbox version a score of 7 out of 10 and stated that "When buildings light up—Big Ben, say—you can let your opponents know what time it is by picking up the structure and hurling it at them."

The game grossed over $15 million in the United States.

References

External links
 
 

2002 video games
3D fighting games
Atari games
Game Boy Advance games
GameCube games
Godzilla games
Infogrames games
Kaiju video games
Multiplayer and single-player video games
Science fiction video games
Video games about extraterrestrial life
Video games developed in the United States
Video games scored by Jake Kaufman
Video games set in London
Video games set in Los Angeles
Video games set in Osaka
Video games set in San Francisco
Video games set in Seattle
Video games set in Tokyo
Video games set on fictional islands
Video games set on fictional planets
Video games with custom soundtrack support
Xbox games
WayForward games
Pipeworks Studios games